Paul Shirley served in the California legislature. During the Mexican–American War, he served in the US Army.

References

American military personnel of the Mexican–American War
Members of the California State Legislature
Year of birth missing
Year of death missing